Vouni is a small village in Limassol District, Cyprus, located 7 km north of Agios Therapon. The name of the village is derived from its location, in which Vouni means "low mountain" in Greek.

History
The earliest recording of Vouni dates back to the Middle Ages, such that it appears in Venetian maps under the name "Voni".

According to local tradition there used to be four settlements in the area of the present village, which were built on low mountains; three of which were known as Pera Vounin, Velonaka and Ais Mamas, which were desolated as a result of the plague which struck Cyprus in 1692. The fourth settlement, Vouni, was salvaged and protected by Agios Ioannis Prodromos, to whom the main church of the village is dedicated. Residents of the three settlements that withstood the plague moved to Vouni.

Population

See also

 Souni-Zanakia

References

Communities in Limassol District